Monte Wolfe (April 20, 1886 –  March 7, 1940), born Archie Edwin Wright on the lands of the Mandan, Hidatsa, and Arikara Nation. During his lifetime he used the aliases Lone Wolf, Archie Arlingtone, E.D. McGrath, U.S. Forest Service Ranger Gorham, and his preferred alias, Monte Wolfe. His early life was characterized by repeated family homestead migrations to the Minnesota and Dakota Territories, California, and Washington state. At each homestead, the family built log cabins and barns, dug wells, and planted wheat and other crops. Skills Archie maintained throughout this life.

Archie’s life can be best described as Gumpian as he became an expert in everything he tried, and always showed up where something important was transpiring. a pioneering post-Spanish American War Aviator, mechanic, and Sailor. He was also a skilled cowboy and 20 mule teamster, a prospector and miner for gold and coal, and a winter fur trapper with a vast trap line that ran from Northern Yosemite to Lake Tahoe. 

In his later years, he and notorious nighttime campsite “visitor”.

He was a highly skilled builder of log structures like barns, cabins, and out-structures and he worked alone. His most impressive log cabin survives, deep in the Mokelumne Wilderness to this day.

Biography

Early life

 Archie Edwin Wright was born on April 20, 1886 in the Dakota Territory. In 1900, when he was 13 years old, his family migrated west by covered wagon along the Oregon Trail, crossing into California over the treacherous Donner Pass settling in California’s northlands  to grow olives in Corning, California. After two years, the family had saved enough to sell the Corning homestead and purchase a section of land and farm in Washington state’s Palouse region to grow  wheat. The Wright’s homesteading days were over.

Navy Career

In 1907, when he was 21, it was time for him to leave the farm. He joined the U.S. Navy and was assigned to the wooden sailing ship  for training in San Francisco Bay. The three masted, single screw steamer had been built by the Union during the American Civil War. Today, the Pensacola wreck rests, burnt, in the shallows of San Francisco Bay, near San Francisco International Airport.

After training, Archie’s first duty assignment was aboard the  a first generation Armored Cruiser, where he cruised the Pacific Ocean with the Great White Fleet. While the entire fleet was anchored in San Francisco Bay for a Naval Review there was an incident aboard the USS California. The USS California was to receive their ceremonial silver service by California’s governor,  the Secretary of Defense, and the Great White Fleet’s commanding officer, Admiral Uriel Sebree the commander-in-chief of the Pacific Fleet.

According to the logbook of the USS California, Archie was disciplined three times during their stay in the Bay. The first offense was using foul language in the presence of civilian visitors, the next two offenses were reparation for his obstinance. After his third stay in the USS California’s brig, he decided to walk. While docked in Vallejo Junction on San Francisco Bay awaiting access to the Mare Island Naval Shipyard he gathered his uniforms and disposed of them, then in the early morning of xx/xxxx he walked off the ship and traveled east, and inland. After that event, his fear of Naval reprisal colored his decisions, and stayed with him for the rest of his life.

Domestic Bliss in Modesto
He spent the ensuing six months living the life of a 21 year old hobo on the run; looking for work; riding the rails and sleeping wherever he laid his head. In early 1908, he found himself in Modesto, CA. He had met the love of his life, Goldie Faye Coolidge, a local farmer’s daughter and relative of future President Calvin Coolidge. But, he was still hungry and cold.

Arrested in Stanislaus County

After illegally entering a vacated farmhouse in Stanislaus County, and absconding with canned food and used clothing he was tracked down, arrested, tried, and convicted of 2nd Degree Burglary, his first offense. 

He was sentenced by the Stanislaus County Superior Court to 18 months hard labor at the notorious Folsom State Prison under an “old law” mandating stiff sentences for first-time offenders. Expecting a slap on the wrist, he was dumbfounded when he received his sentence. He spent the next 18 months hammering granite in the prison quarry, and ruminating about his ‘unfair’ treatment just when his life was beginning to improve.

Marriage and Family

On the day of Archie’s release from  prison, he immediately boarded a train to Spokane and the Palouse in Washington state. Goldie Faye awaited there and they were immediately married. The infants started nine months later, and Goldie bore four, in four years; Goldie Ina, Edwin, Glenn, and Norman.

Archie found work as a clerk in Modesto, CA, but with six mouths to feed, he needed a higher paying job. He later landed a job as a lumberjack at the Westside Lumber Company, and later as a Timberman and mucker in the Eagle Shawmut Mine near Tuolumne City, California. Goldie took a job as camp cook at the Westside Lumber Company.

The 2nd Aero Squadron

In 1916, a rift opened between Goldie Faye and Archie; the cause is lost to time. Archie collected his last paycheck at the mine, traveled to San Francisco, and joined the U.S. Army. He was immediately shipped to Fort Mills on Corregidor in the Philippines and assigned to the 2nd Aero Squadron  in the Harbor Defenses of Manila and Subic Bays. Letters sent home to Goldie Faye with paychecks indicate that Archie dearly missed his children and Goldie.

The Aviation Section, U.S. Signal Corps activated the Second Aero Squadron on 12 May 1915. It was the second to be organized in the United States Army, as noted by its numerical designation. It was organized at Rockwell Field, San Diego, California, where the only Aviation School at that time was located, and it was from this school that most of its squadron members came from. Other members were taken from the 1st Aero Squadron, which was the only completely equipped squadron in the Army.

It was the policy of the Aviation School to completely train and equip a squadron before sending it into the field. The squadron consisted of six flying officers and thirty-nine enlisted men, primarily mechanics. Two officers and ten men were transferred from the 1st Aero Squadron. The USAT Sheridan sailed from San Francisco for Manila on 5 January 1916 whith the squadron. After two weeks of quarantine, the unit reached its station on Corregidor on 14 February without aircraft. It was the first complete aviation unit assigned outside of the United States.

The 2nd received four Martin S-Hydro seaplanes (Signal Corps numbers 56-59) on 13 March and 15 April, and began flying on 8 May 1916. For the first time ever, an aeroplane was equipped with  experimental radio transmitter, giving the aircraft a broadcast range of 29 miles. On 28 June, the company provided artillery spotting and adjustment, another first, ;for target practice with the Fort Mills batteries. Personnel for a second company were assembled and the unit was re-designated the 1st Company, 2nd Aero Squadron on 20 July 1917. The 2nd Company, 2nd Aero Squadron received two Wright Brothers aeroplanes and was based, in Hawaii.

As the U.S. entry into World War 1 approached, the 2nd Aero Squadron was redeployed to Kelly Field in San Antonio, TX. The voyage was to originate in Manila, with stopovers in Guam and Hawaii before arriving in San Francisco, CA. The following morning, the airmen boarded a train and began their final leg to Kelly Field. Archie never made it to the train. He had to go home to Goldie and his kids in Modesto.

But… he was too late. In desperation for her family, Goldie had met another man and subsequently became pregnant in 1918.

Goldie soon moved with the, now five children to Sacramento. Archie retreated to the Sierra Nevada mountains where he would spend the rest of is life, alone. Inttially, he found work as a cowboy and prospector. Upon the arrival of the World War 1 draft, Wright registered as "Monte Wolfe, Prospector”

Retreat from society
In the Sierra, Wolfe worked a number of jobs to earn the income he needed, including trapping, prospecting, and working as a fishing guide. At this point, he had not yet withdrawn from wider society altogether. That would change in 1927, when Wolfe had another run-in with law enforcement – he was arrested for felony burglary and spent 75 days in a Tuolumne County jail. In his trial that took place after this delay, the jury found Wolfe not guilty; however, upon acquittal, the county sheriff drove him to the city of Angels Camp in nearby Calaveras County, "unceremoniously dumped" him there, and told him to never again set foot in Tuolumne County.

According to historian Eric Jung, this series of events made Wolfe "finally decide 'I've had enough of people'". For the rest of his life he would live off the land in a rugged area deep in the Sierra Nevada mountains.

Life in the Sierra
In the canyon of the Mokelumne River, Wolfe built himself two log cabins, where he lived for the rest of his life. Friends came to visit from time to time, and he occasionally ventured into the bars along the highway about ten miles away. Aside from that, he lived as a hermit, and was entirely self-sufficient.

Disappearance
One day late in the spring of 1940, three of Wolfe's friends – the brothers Art, Harry, and Reuben Schimke – set out to visit Wolfe in his cabin. Upon their arrival, they found the cabin empty, and could not find Wolfe. The last date crossed off on his calendar had been April 20 – his birthday – of that same year. It is unknown what caused Wolfe's disappearance and presumed death, but the surviving Schimke brothers believe it was unintentional. Wolfe had been suffering from some chronic health problems, which could have made him more likely to fall victim to an accident.

Cabin preservation dispute
Monte Wolfe's first cabin was destroyed by Forest Service workers sometime before 2009. His second cabin remains standing to this day. This cabin, one of the last surviving pioneer structures in California built by one person entirely by hand, has become embroiled in a dispute between wilderness protection and historic preservation
. After passage of the Wilderness Act of 1964, the ground upon which the cabin sits became part of the newly designated Mokelumne Wilderness. Wilderness area regulations generally prohibit the maintenance or construction of any buildings or structures not necessary to patrolling and maintaining the wilderness itself. As a result, rangers have at times sought to speed up the natural decay of the cabin, while preservationists have attempted to maintain it. The two groups at one point reached an agreement to leave the cabin as is in a state of "arrested decay", but both sides have accused the other side of violating this agreement.

References

 Dakota Territory
 People from North Dakota
 People from California
 People from Alpine County, California
 1886 births
 1940 deaths